St. Joseph's College was a seminary of the Archdiocese of San Francisco at Mountain View, California opened in September 1924.   It was also referred to as St. Joseph's Seminary. It was run by the Sulpician Fathers.

Its creation was supervised by Archbishop Edward J. Hanna.  Hanna ordered the purchase of 700 acres and the seminary was considered "the jewel of his accomplishments."

The seminary buildings were severely damaged by the Loma Prieta earthquake on 17 October 1989. The seminary was permanently closed on June 30, 1991.  The site is now part of Rancho San Antonio County Park.

External links
 Official site

References

Catholic seminaries in the United States
Roman Catholic Archdiocese of San Francisco
Educational institutions established in 1924
Former theological colleges in the United States
1924 establishments in California